Pilar Bogado Cruzado is a Flamenco singer from Moguer in the province of Huelva, Spain.

References

Living people
Flamenco singers
People from Huelva
Year of birth missing (living people)